Edward Waple (13 October 1647 – 8 June 1712) was an English Anglican priest.

Waple was born in the parish of Holy Trinity the Less in the City of London. He was educated at Merchant Taylor's and St John's College, Oxford. He was appointed Archdeacon of Taunton in 1682; Vicar of St Sepulchre-without-Newgate in 1683; and Canon of Winchester in 1690.

A collection of thirty of his sermons was published in 1714-15. Subsequent volumes were published in 1718 and 1720.

Notes

17th-century English Anglican priests
18th-century English Anglican priests
Archdeacons of Taunton
Alumni of St John's College, Oxford
People educated at Merchant Taylors' School, Northwood
1647 births
1712 deaths
People from the City of London